Vella is a municipality in Switzerland.

Vella may also refer to:

Places
Vella, Burkina Faso, Africa
Vella Flat, Antarctica
Vella Gulf, a waterway in the Western Province of the Solomon Islands
location of the Battle of Vella Gulf, 1943
Vella Lavella, an island in the Western Province of the Solomon Islands, giving its name to:
Land Battle of Vella Lavella, 1943
Naval Battle of Vella Lavella, 1943

Other uses
Vella (insect), a genus of insects
Vella (plant), a genus of plants
Vella (surname)